Filippo Baldi and Andrea Pellegrino were the defending champions but chose not to defend their title.

Tomislav Brkić and Ante Pavić won the title after defeating Luca Margaroli and Andrea Vavassori 6–3, 6–2 in the final.

Seeds

Draw

References

External links
 Main draw

Internazionali di Tennis Città dell'Aquila - Doubles
2019 Doubles